Saint-Laurent-du-Var is a train station on the line from Marseille to Ventimiglia, situated in Saint-Laurent-du-Var, west of Nice, in the department of Alpes-Maritimes in the region of Provence-Alpes-Côte d'Azur, France.

The station is located in the vicinity of the CAP 3000, the largest shopping centre in Nice. Numerous bus serves link the station to the Shopping Centre.

Services 
The station is only served by TER with services eastbound towards Nice, Menton and Ventimiglia and westbound services towards Cannes, Grasse and Draguignan. The station is served by regional trains (TER Provence-Alpes-Côte d'Azur) to Cannes, Grasse, Antibes and Nice.

References 

Railway stations in Alpes-Maritimes
Transport in Nice